Vadzim Lasowski (born 4 October 1975) is a retired Belarusian footballer. Assistant trainer of  FC Shakhtyor Soligorsk.

Honours
Dinamo-93 Minsk
Belarusian Cup winner: 1994–95

Dinamo Minsk
Belarusian Cup winner: 2002–03

Shakhtyor Soligorsk
Belarusian Premier League champion: 2005
Belarusian Cup winner: 2003–04

External links
 
 by.tribuna.com

1975 births
Living people
Belarusian footballers
FC Dinamo-93 Minsk players
FC Dynamo Brest players
FC Shakhtyor Soligorsk players
FC Dinamo Minsk players
FC Granit Mikashevichi players
FC Slutsk players
Association football defenders